This is a list of rivers of Nepal, east to west. This list is arranged by drainage basin, indented to show the structure of confluences.  Tributaries rising inside India are not shown.

The basin is generally categorized into ten major basins as listed below.

Kankai river basin

Kankai River
Mai River
Yubragyi river

Koshi river basin

Koshi River
Tamor
Mewa River
Palun Khola
Ghunsa River
Yamatari river
Arun
Sunkoshi
Chaku River
Bhairabkunda River
Dudh Koshi
Imja Khola
Hongu River
Solu River
Likhu Khola
Bhote Koshi
Tama Koshi
Indravati River
Melamchi River

Bagmati river basin

Bagmati River
Kamala River
Lakhandei River
Bisnumati River

Gandaki river basin

Gandaki River (Narayani) (Kali Gandaki)
Binai River
East Rapti River
Karra River
Kukhreni River
Trishuli River
Langtang River
Seti Gandaki River
Marshyangdi
Chhandi River
Budhi Gandaki River
Nisi River
Madi River
Rudi River
Modi River
Myagdi River

West Rapti river basin

West Rapti River

Babai river basin

Babai River
Sharada Khola
Sarju River
Mohan River
Kandra River
Bheri River
Thuli Bheri River
Sani Bheri River
Thuli River
Seti River
Budhi Ganga River
Sinja River
Mugu Karnali
Langu River
Panjang River
Humla Karnali
Tanke River

Karnali river basin

Karnali
West Rapti River
Rohni River
Tinau River
Mari River
Jimruk River
Tila River
Hima river

Mahakali river basin

Mahakali River (Kali River)
Surna River
Chameliya River
Lipu Khola

Other minor river basins

Mechi River
Timai River

Ratnawati (Raato) River

Bakraha River

Budhi Khola (Itahari)

Balan River
Khutti River

Phuljor river

Dhansar river

Lalbakaiya river
 Bakaya river
 Dhansar river

Pashah river

Sirsiya River

Bherang river

 Biraha River

 Dano River

 Banganga River (Kapilvastu, Nepal)

 Mohana River (Nepal)

See also 
 List of lakes of Nepal

References

Rand McNally, The New International Atlas, 1993.
U.S. Army Map Service, 1966, Manasarowar
U.S. Army Map Service, 1966, Bihar
 GEOnet Names Server

Nepal
Rivers